Anthony Wayne was an American army general during the American Revolutionary War.

Anthony Wayne may also refer to:

 Anthony Wayne High School, in Whitehouse, Ohio
 Anthony Wayne Generals, the athletic teams of Anthony Wayne High School
 Anthony Wayne Bridge, in Toledo, Ohio
 Anthony Wayne Local School District, a school district in Northwest Ohio
 Anthony Wayne Elementary School, Erie, Pennsylvania
 , a Great Lakes sidewheel steamboat that exploded on Lake Erie

See also
 Earl Anthony Wayne, US international policy maker and diplomat
 Anthony Wayne England, former NASA Astronaut